Maiden England (re-released in 2013 as Maiden England '88) is a live video by the band Iron Maiden during their Seventh Son of a Seventh Son world tour, which was dubbed Seventh Tour of a Seventh Tour.

It was recorded at the National Exhibition Centre in Birmingham, England on 27 and 28 November 1988, released on VHS in November 1989, followed by a limited VHS/CD edition in 1994. The CD in this package does not include two songs that are in the video ("Can I Play with Madness" and "Hallowed Be Thy Name"), due to space limitations. In 2013, the full concert footage, including encores which were not featured in the original VHS, was reissued on DVD, CD and LP under the new title, Maiden England '88.

The video was directed and edited by Steve Harris, Iron Maiden's founder and bassist.

Background
After sitting in on the editing process of their music videos, and having been less involved in their previous concert video, Live After Death, the band's bassist, Steve Harris, decided that he would direct and edit their next film. According to Harris, the band decided to document the Birmingham concerts because he "wanted to film with 10 cameras so we needed to do it in a place where that amount of equipment wouldn't get in the way of the paying punters." This narrowed the band's options down to the NEC and Wembley Arena, but eventually chose the former as they were more "amenable about the idea". According to manager Rod Smallwood, Harris' briefing to the camera crew was to try and film "as the fans saw it", with Harris arguing that this would be a good way to capture the concert's atmosphere.

So that he could edit the video at his own pace, Harris bought all of the necessary equipment himself and installed it at his home in Essex, where he worked on the film for six months. Although they occasionally visited Harris to check on his progress, the rest of the band were largely uninvolved in the project, although, at his insistence, a piece of footage showing guitarist Dave Murray mouthing the lyrics to the opening song was removed.

A DVD re-issue of the concert film was first mentioned by Iron Maiden in September 2007, with a release date set for 2008, but was later delayed. In an interview with German magazine Rock Hard in August 2012, Harris confirmed that Maiden England would be re-released in 2013, with the concert footage expanded to comprise the show's encores which were not included in the original VHS. On 12 February 2013, Iron Maiden announced that Maiden England would be re-released on DVD, CD and picture disc on 25 March 2013 under the title Maiden England '88. Along with the aforementioned encores, the new video also includes the third part of the "History of Iron Maiden" documentary series (continuing from 2004's The History of Iron Maiden – Part 1: The Early Days and 2008's Live After Death re-issue) as well as promo videos and the 1987 documentary 12 Wasted Years.

From 2012 to 2014, Iron Maiden undertook the Maiden England World Tour, which is largely based around the original video in setlist and stage design.

Critical reception

AllMusic gave the original VHS 4 out of 5, deeming it "a strong effort", but also stating that it is "risky... because it doesn't rely on hits" and that it "doesn't have the seminal power of [their] own extraordinary Live After Death from four years earlier". They also gave four marks to the 2013 reissue, arguing that the additional songs "help to turn the live set into a more well-rounded listening experience", concluding that it is "a solid concert that shows one of the most influential bands in heavy metal getting down to business and bringing some epic metal to an enthralled crowd".

Classic Rock gave the 2013 DVD a score of 8 out of 10, remarking that the concert footage is "a succinct encapsulation of how great Maiden are when all the gears mesh together", concluding that "when it comes to creating a fan-pleasing effort, no one does it with quite the same degree of thought as Maiden."

Track listing

1989 VHS track listing
 "Moonchild" (Adrian Smith, Bruce Dickinson)
 "The Evil That Men Do" (Smith, Dickinson, Steve Harris)
 "The Prisoner" (Harris, Smith)
 "Still Life" (Dave Murray, Harris)
 "Die with Your Boots On" (Smith, Dickinson, Harris)
 "Infinite Dreams"  (Harris)
 "Killers" (Harris, Paul Di'Anno)
 "Can I Play with Madness" (Smith, Dickinson, Harris)
 "Heaven Can Wait" (Harris)
 "Wasted Years" (Smith)
 "The Clairvoyant" (Harris)
 "Seventh Son of a Seventh Son" (Harris)
 "The Number of the Beast" (Harris)
 "Hallowed Be Thy Name" (Harris)
 "Iron Maiden" (Harris)

1994 CD track listing

2013 DVD track listing

DVD 1
 "Moonchild" (Adrian Smith, Bruce Dickinson)
 "The Evil That Men Do" (Smith, Dickinson, Steve Harris)
 "The Prisoner" (Harris, Smith)
 "Still Life" (Dave Murray, Harris)
 "Die with Your Boots On" (Smith, Dickinson, Harris)
 "Infinite Dreams"  (Harris)
 "Killers" (Harris, Paul Di'Anno)
 "Can I Play with Madness" (Smith, Dickinson, Harris)
 "Heaven Can Wait" (Harris)
 "Wasted Years" (Smith)
 "The Clairvoyant" (Harris)
 "Seventh Son of a Seventh Son" (Harris)
 "The Number of the Beast" (Harris)
 "Hallowed Be Thy Name" (Harris)
 "Iron Maiden" (Harris)
 "Run to the Hills" (Harris)
 "Running Free" (Harris, Di'Anno)
 "Sanctuary" (Harris, Murray, Di'Anno)

DVD 2
 "The History of Iron Maiden" – Part 3 (40 minutes approximately)
 Continuation of "The History of Iron Maiden" documentary series, following 2004's The Early Days and 2008's Live After Death. Band members, crew, friends and associates talk about the period in the band's career which saw the writing, recording and release of the Somewhere in Time (1986) and Seventh Son of a Seventh Son (1988) albums, their respective tours (1986-87's Somewhere on Tour and 1988's Seventh Tour of a Seventh Tour), and the recording of the Maiden England live video.
 12 Wasted Years (90 minutes approximately)
 1987 film documenting the band's first 12 years with interviews and live footage.
 Promotional clips for "Wasted Years", "Stranger in a Strange Land", "Can I Play with Madness", "The Evil That Men Do" and "The Clairvoyant".

2013 CD track listing

Personnel
Production and performance credits are adapted from the VHS cover, reissue DVD and CD, and AllMusic.
Iron Maiden
 Bruce Dickinson – lead vocals
 Dave Murray – lead & rhythm guitars,
 Adrian Smith – lead & rhythm guitars, backing vocals,
 Steve Harris – bass guitar, backing vocals, director, editing
 Nicko McBrain – drums
Additional musicians
 Michael Kenney – keyboards
Production
 Martin Birch – producer, engineer, mixing
 Derek Riggs – cover illustration
 Ross Halfin – photography
 Andy Matthews – remastering, editing (2013 reissue), director and producer ("The History of Iron Maiden" documentary)
 Kevin Shirley – mixing (2013 reissue)
 Ted Jensen – mastering (2013 reissue)
 Leon Zervos – mastering (2013 reissue)
 Hervé Monjeaud – cover illustration (2013 reissue)
 Rod Smallwood – management
 Andy Taylor – management
 John Jackson – booking agent

Charts

VHS

DVD

Album

Certifications

References

External links
 Maiden England at the Internet Movie Database

Iron Maiden video albums
Live video albums
Iron Maiden live albums
1989 video albums
1994 live albums
Live heavy metal albums
Picture Music International video albums